John James Daniels (born 1915; date of death unknown) was an English professional footballer who played in the Football League for Millwall as an inside right.

Personal life 
Daniels served in the British Army during the Second World War and after his retirement from football, he became a milkman.

References 

English footballers

Clapton Orient F.C. wartime guest players
English Football League players
1915 births
Year of death missing
Place of death missing
Footballers from Kent
Association football inside forwards
Association football outside forwards
Millwall F.C. players
Ebbsfleet United F.C. players
York City F.C. wartime guest players
British Army personnel of World War II